Operation Badr was an Iranian operation conducted during the Iran–Iraq War against the forces of Ba'athist Iraq. The Iranians launched their offensive on March 11 and succeeded in capturing a part of the Basra-Amarah-Baghdad highway. The following Iraqi counterattack, however, forced the Iranians out in a continual war of endless stalemate.

Prelude
After its failure to capture Basra in 1982, Iran launched Operation Kheibar in 1984 to capture the Baghdad-Basra highway. This resulted in the Battle of the Marshes, and the operation failed, but Iran planned for Operation Badr in a further attempt to capture it. Without coincidence, the operation was named after the Prophet Mohammed's first military victory in Mecca centuries before.

The aim of the offensive was focused on capturing the Baghdad-Basra highway, which was a vital link between the two major cities, and for the movement of military supplies and vehicles to support and replenish the Iraqi defenders at the front-line. Another objective included the crossing of the Tigris River, which would cut off Basra from Iraq and give an equally psychological blow to the country. This operation was similar to Operation Kheibar, except it consisted of far superior planning. Iran used 100,000 troops, and 60,000 more in reserve. Iran assessed the marshy terrain and plotted points where to land tanks. Iran also would construct pontoon bridges across the marshes. The Basij forces were also equipped with anti-tank weapons.

Iran found itself reorganizing the Pasdaran and Basij units into more conventional forces as a response to several failures in the past. Although highly motivated and outnumbering the Iraqis, the Iranians were poorly trained and lacked heavy equipment, including armor, artillery, and air support to back up the operation. At the same time, Iran was also suffering the effects of the U.S.'s Operation Staunch embargo. Conversely, the Iraqis, under command of General Hisham al-Fakhri, had the luxury of better equipment, better training, and the illegal use of poison gas.

The battle
On March 11, Iran sent in a force of 100,000 men to attack the vicinity of Majnoon Island; this force landed at al-Qurnah, where the Tigris River skirts the highway and made a charge for it, succeeding in its partial capture, in response to which Iraq opened a counterattack with artillery, air strikes and armor divisions from the north. This battle was the first time that units of the Republican Guard were employed as reserve forces.
The Iranians attacked from the Majnoun Islands, once again taking the Iraqis by surprise, striking at the southern end of Iraq's 4th army corps, on a 12 km wide front.

The sheer ferocity of the Iranian offensive broke through the Iraqi lines, the Revolutionary Guard, with the support of tanks and artillery broke through the north of Qurna on 14 March. Two days into the offensive, the Iranians penetrated 16 km (10 miles) into Iraq; that same night 30,000 Iranian troops reached the Tigris River and crossed it using three pontoon bridges, one of which was capable of supporting heavy vehicles. Thus they succeeded in capturing part of the Baghdad-Basra Highway 6, which had eluded them during Operations Dawn 5 and Dawn 6;[28] however, while being successful the Iranians had dangerously overextended themselves, and were still suffering from shortages of armor.

Saddam responded by launching chemical attacks (tabun agent) against the Iranian positions along the highway and by initiating the second "war of the cities", with an air and missile campaign against twenty Iranian population centres, including Tehran.[23] The Iraqis had attempted to cause heavy Iranian casualties during the battle by channeling their infantry into pre-set artillery 'kill zones'; this counterattack was launched after the Iranians had reached their objective.

Under General Sultan Hashim Ahmad al-Tai and General Jamal Zanoun (two of their most skilled commanders), the Iraqis launched air and artillery attacks against the Iranian positions, pinning them down; this was followed by a massive pincer attack against the Iranians, using mechanized infantry and tanks.[28] The battle came to a climax when Saddam Hussein ordered the use of chemical attacks to evict the Iranians; the Iraqis also flooded the Iranian trenches with specially constructed pipes, diverting water from the Tigris River. Under such heavy pressure the Iranians were forced to retreat. Helicopters also inflicted heavy losses on the retreating forces, forcing them back to the Hoveyzeh marshes and destroying the pontoon bridges. By March 16, all of the Iranian forces had retreated back to the marshes.

A short time after the initial attack on the highway, Iran had planned to launch a diversionary one against another area, but it began too late and it too was defeated.

Thus the Iranians were eventually driven out of their positions, and the highway retaken by the Iraqis. Operation Badr resulted in 8,000 casualties for Iraq and 30,000 casualties for Iran and the Iraqi counterattacks were able to force the Iranians back to their previous lines.

Aftermath
In response to Operation Badr, Saddam opened the second "War of the Cities" during March that year, hitting cities as far as Isfahan, Tabriz, Shiraz, and even Tehran. Iran responded in kind with attacks of her own against Iraq, mostly by launching shells and medium range missiles at the port city of Basra.

While Iran had not succeeded due to the shortages of Iranian armor and air power, it convinced the Iranian leadership that their tactics were still good, as they had managed to get so far into Iraq. The Iraqis were also convinced their tactics were sound as well. Iran's weakness would remain lack of heavy equipment, and they would suffer during Iraqi counterattacks with heavy weapons.

With experiences gained during this battle and the earlier Battle of the Marshes, Iran launched the successful Operation Dawn 8, capturing the Faw Peninsula.

See also 
 Operation Quds-1

Bibliography
 In The Name Of God: The Khomeini Decade, by Robin Wright, Simon and Schuster, 1989
 The Iran–Iraq War: Chaos in a Vacuum, by Stephen C. Pelletiere, Praeger Publications, New York, NY, 1992.
 https://books.google.com/books?id=dUHhTPdJ6yIC&printsec=frontcover&source=gbs_atb#v=onepage&q&f=false

https://books.google.com/books?id=dUHhTPdJ6yIC&pg=PT877&lpg=PT877&dq=Iran+at+war+1500-1988+Badr&source=bl&ots=LrQ7K_8PLg&sig=TLuPFKmjLFNLFhghliC1E_UFBdM&hl=en&sa=X&ei=MgyHUY3GA83A4AOT4oCIAw&ved=0CEQQ6AEwBA

Military operations of the Iran–Iraq War in 1985
Military operations involving chemical weapons during the Iran–Iraq War